The White Kei River or Wit-Kei River is a river in the Eastern Cape, South Africa. It originates north of Queenstown, beginning its course as the Grootvleispruit river and eventually joining the Black Kei River, to form the Great Kei River.

The Xonxa Dam is located in the White Kei River. Presently this river is part of the Mzimvubu to Keiskama Water Management Area.

See also 
Great Kei River
 List of rivers of South Africa

References

External links
SA Estuarine Land-cover: Great Kei Catchment
Towns of historical interest in the 'kei

Rivers of the Eastern Cape